Chaloem Phra Kiat is a district (amphoe) of Nan province, northern Thailand.

History
The district was created on 5 December 1996, together with four other districts named Chaloem Phra Kiat in celebration of the 50th anniversary of King Bhumibol Adulyadej's ascension to the throne.

The area of the district was created from two districts. Tambon Huai Kon was previously part of Thung Chang district, while Khun Nan came from Bo Kluea district.

Geography

Neighboring districts are (from the south clockwise) Bo Kluea, Pua, and Thung Chang. To the north and east is Xaignabouli province of Laos with an international border crossing at Huay Kon/Muang Ngeun.

The district is in the Luang Prabang Range mountain area of the Thai highlands.

Administration
The district is divided into two sub-districts (tambons), which are further subdivided into 22 villages (mubans). There are no municipal (thesaban) areas, and two tambon administrative organizations (TAO).

References

External links
amphoe.com

Chaloem Phra Kiat